Branislav is a Czech, Croatian, Russian, Slovak, Serbian, Slovene and Ukrainian given name. It also appears in Polish as Bronisław, in Russian as Bronislav, and Ukrainian as Boronyslav. The name is derived from the Slavic elements braniti, or broni-ti (to protect in infinitive), that is brani (that who protects) and slav-a (glory) and means "warrior", "defender of the glory".

In some contexts, the anagrams Barnislav and Nabrislav (Nabriša) is used.

Nicknames 
Branko, Branio, Broněk, Broniek, Slávek, Slavo, Bane, Brane, Braňo, Braniša.

Branislav in other languages 
Belarusian: Браніслаў / Branisłaŭ (Branislaw)
Czech: Bronislav or Branislav
Croatian: Branislav
Lithuanian: Bronislovas 
Polish: Bronisław
Russian: Бронислав (Bronislav)
Serbian: Бранислав / Branislav, Бранисав / Branisav or Бранко / Branko
Slovak: Branislav or Braňo
Slovenian: Brane
Ukrainian: Boronyslav

Notable people
 Branislav Bajić, Serb
 Branislav Belić, Serb
 Branislav Fodrek, Slovak
 Branislav Grbić, Serb
 Branislav Ivanović, Serb
 Branislav Ivković, Serb
 Branislav Kerac, Serb
 Branislav Krunić, Serb
 Branislav Lečić, Serb
 Branislav Mezei, Slovak
 Branislav Miličević, Serb
 Branislav Mitrović, Serbian water polo player, Olympic champion
 Branislav Mojićević, Serb
 Branislav Nušić, Serbian Vlach
 Branislav Obžera, Slovak
 Branislav Pokrajac, Serb
 Branislav Prelević, Serb
 Branislav Regec, Slovak
 Branislav Rzeszoto, Slovak
 Branislav Simić, Serb
 Branislav Šoškić, Serb
 Branisłaŭ Taraškievič, Belarusian politician and linguist
 Bronislav Poloczek, Czech actor
 Bronislav Kaminski, Soviet commander S.S. Sturmbrigade R.O.N.A.
 Bronisław Malinowski, Polish anthropologist
 Bronisław Komorowski, Polish politician who served as President of Poland from 2010 to 2015.

See also
 
 Bronisław (disambiguation)
 Slavic names

External links 
 Behind the Name - Branislav

Bosnian masculine given names
Czech masculine given names
Slovak masculine given names
Slovene masculine given names
Serbian masculine given names

Masculine given names
Slavic masculine given names